Kâzım Sevüktekin (1877 – April 1, 1949) was an officer of the Ottoman Army and the general of the Turkish Army, a politician of the Republic of Turkey.

Medals and decorations
Medal of the Battle of Greece (Yunan Muharebe Madalyası)
Gallipoli Star (Ottoman Empire)
Silver Medal of Liyaqat
Silver Medal of Imtiyaz
Gold Medal of Liyaqat
Medal of the Red Crescent (Hilal-i Ahmer)
Prussia Iron Cross 1st and 2nd class
Medal of Independence with Red Ribbon & Citation

See also
List of high-ranking commanders of the Turkish War of Independence

Sources

External links

1877 births
1949 deaths
Military personnel from Istanbul
Ottoman Military Academy alumni
Ottoman Army officers
Ottoman military personnel of the Greco-Turkish War (1897)
Ottoman military personnel of the Italo-Turkish War
Ottoman military personnel of the Balkan Wars
Ottoman military personnel of World War I
Turkish military personnel of the Turkish War of Independence
Turkish military personnel of the Greco-Turkish War (1919–1922)
Turkish Army generals
Deputies of Diyarbakır
Burials at Turkish State Cemetery
Recipients of the Gold Liakat Medal
Recipients of the Silver Imtiyaz Medal
Recipients of the Iron Cross (1914), 1st class
Recipients of the Medal of Independence with Red Ribbon (Turkey)
Deputies of Mardin